Mission—Port Moody was a federal electoral district in British Columbia, Canada, that was  represented in the House of Commons of Canada from 1979 to 1988.

This riding was created in 1976 from parts of Fraser Valley East and Fraser Valley West ridings.

It was abolished in 1987 when it was redistributed into Mission—Coquitlam and Port Moody—Coquitlam  ridings.

It consisted of:
 the Dewdney-Alouette Regional District;
 the northwestern part of the Greater Vancouver Regional District.

Members of Parliament

Election results

See also 

 List of Canadian federal electoral districts
 Past Canadian electoral districts

External links
Riding history from the Library of Parliament
 Website of the Parliament of Canada

Former federal electoral districts of British Columbia